Vjera Petrović-Njegoš, Princess of Montenegro (Serbian Cyrillic: Вјера Петровић-Његош; 22 February 1887 – 31 October 1927) was a member of the Petrović-Njegoš dynasty as the eleventh (of twelve) child of Nicholas I of Montenegro and Milena of Montenegro.

Vjera and her sister Xenia was not educated at the Smolny Institute in Russia like her eldest sisters had been, but educated at home. She was described as pretty and elegant but more sensitive and timid, and not as energetic or strongwilled, like her elders sisters.  

She was interested in painting, but is foremost remembered because of the effort she made helping the injured victims of an explosion in the harbor of Bar, for which she was awarded a medal. She left Montenegro when her father was deposed in 1918 and settled with her parents and her sister Xenia in France. She participated in humanitarian work in France as well. 

She died in France. She was buried with her parents and sister in San Remo, but like them, her remains were reburied in Cetinje in 1989.

Notes

References

1887 births
1927 deaths
People from Cetinje
Montenegrin princesses
Eastern Orthodox Christians from Montenegro
Petrović-Njegoš dynasty
Burials at Serbian Orthodox monasteries and churches
Burials in Montenegro
Daughters of kings